Plus is an American autonomous trucking technology company based in Cupertino, California. The company develops Level 4 autonomous trucking technology for commercial freight trucks. In 2019, the company completed the first cross-country driverless freight delivery in the U.S. The company's self-driving system began to be used commercially in 2021.

History
The company was founded in California in 2016, by a group of Stanford Ph.D. graduates who decided to use their knowledge of artificial intelligence to develop self-driving technology for the long-haul trucking industry. Plus was one of the first companies working on autonomous trucks to receive a California Autonomous Vehicle Testing License the following year, allowing it to test its technology in California.

The company began operating in China during 2018 in addition to the US. Plus also demonstrated its technology in an unmanned truck at Qingdao Port in China that same year. Chinese online freight marketplace, Full Truck Alliance, became an investor in Plus in 2018.  In 2019 the company entered into a joint venture with the Chinese truck manufacturer FAW Jiefang.

A commercial freight truck using Plus's self-driving technology drove across the U.S. from California to Pennsylvania in December 2019, hauling butter for Land O'Lakes. According to Popular Mechanics, this was the first time that an autonomous freight vehicle had driven across the country delivering goods.

Plus raised two rounds of funding in early 2021. In February 2021, it raised a total investment of $200 million. As an extension to that funding, it raised an additional $220 million in March 2021.

The company announced in May 2021 that it had established a deal to go public through a business combination with the special-purpose acquisition company (SPAC), Hennessy Capital Investment Corp. V. The companies canceled the planned merger in November 2021, citing regulatory concerns outside of the U.S.

Also in May 2021, Plus carried out a 4,000-mile drive from Suzhou to Dunhuang on China's Silk Road to test the safety and performance of its self-driving system. The truck was autonomous but supervised during the drive.

The following month, Amazon.com made an order to purchase 1,000 self-driving systems from the company. Plus had started to deliver its self-driving technology to Amazon in February 2021. In a separate deal, Amazon gained the option to purchase up to a 20% stake in Plus.

The company completed a driverless truck demonstration on the Wufengshan highway in China, in June 2021. The driverless semi truck was operated using Plus's Level 4 autonomous driving technology, without a safety driver or use of any remote controls.

Product and technology
Plus is developing Level 4 self-driving technology for semi trucks. The company developed a self-driving system called PlusDrive intended for use with a driver in the vehicle, which can be retrofitted into commercial freight trucks. Plus has also partnered with truck manufacturers to build self-driving trucks. The company's self-driving system incorporates hardware and software using artificial intelligence. The hardware employed by Plus includes cameras, lidar and radar that together provide a complete view of the truck's surroundings. The software processes and makes sense of all data about the truck's surroundings collected through the sensors. 

The company has carried out road testing of its technology in 17 states in the U.S. as of 2021. In addition to its own road testing, Plus's technology is independently tested at the Transportation Research Center.

Plus has partnered with truck manufacturers and trucking fleets to introduce its driving systems. It began to roll out its system to companies in China and the U.S. in 2021 and announced that it would begin production that year.  As of 2021, the company partnered with the European truck manufacturer Iveco to work together on building semi-trucks that could drive autonomously and use liquefied natural gas engines. It also partnered with engine maker Cummins Inc. to develop self-driving trucks fueled by natural gas.

Operations
The company is based in Cupertino, California, and also has offices in Beijing and near to Shanghai. It carries out testing of trucks in the U.S., China, and Europe.

The company is co-founded and led by CEO David Liu, chief operating officer Shawn Kerrigan, chief technology officer Hao Zheng, and chief architect Tim Daly.

References

External links

2016 establishments in California
Companies based in Cupertino, California
Robotics companies of the United States